Antal Kotász (1 September 1929 – 6 July 2003) was a Hungarian football midfielder who played for Hungary in the 1958 FIFA World Cup. He also played for Budapest Honvéd FC.

References

External links
 FIFA profile

1929 births
2003 deaths
Hungarian footballers
Hungary international footballers
Association football midfielders
Budapest Honvéd FC players
1958 FIFA World Cup players
People from Vasvár
Sportspeople from Vas County